27–28 The Shambles is an historic pair of buildings in the English city of York, North Yorkshire. Grade II listed, parts of the structures date to the mid-19th century, with alterations occurring over the next hundred years.

As of 2023, the building is occupied by Shambles Kitchen.

References 

27
Houses in North Yorkshire
19th-century establishments in England
Grade II listed buildings in York
Grade II listed houses
19th century in York